Statistics of Latvian Higher League in the 1972 season.

Overview
It was contested by 13 teams, and Jurnieks won the championship.

League standings

References
 RSSSF

Latvian SSR Higher League
Football 
Latvia